James Madison Rix (December 23, 1811 – March 25, 1856)   was an American newspaper printer editor, politician and lawyer who served as the President of the New Hampshire Senate.

Rix was born to Caleb and Eliza Morrell Rix on December 23, 1811.

Rix married Mary Palmer of Concord, New Hampshire, they had a daughter Eliza Rix

Rix learned the trade of printing by working in the office of  The Democratic Republican newspaper in Haverhill, New Hampshire.

In July 1838 Rix co-founded The Coös County Democrat with James M. Whittemore.

Rix died March 25, 1856 in the City Hotel in Boston, Massachusetts.

Notes

1811 births
1856 deaths
Democratic Party members of the New Hampshire House of Representatives
Democratic Party New Hampshire state senators
Presidents of the New Hampshire Senate
American newspaper publishers (people)
19th-century American journalists
American male journalists
19th-century American male writers
19th-century American politicians
People from Landaff, New Hampshire
19th-century American businesspeople